Greatest Hits Volume II, also known as Greatest Hits Volume II... and Some Other Stuff, is the third greatest hits compilation album by American country music artist Alan Jackson. The original version of this album was only available through December, 2003 and contained two discs: the first disc has 16 hits and two new cuts, while the second disc has eight album tracks. Subsequent releases contained only the first disc.

Track listing

Disc 1
"Little Bitty" (Tom T. Hall) (1996) – 2:39
"Everything I Love" (Harley Allen, Carson Chamberlain) (1997) – 3:07
"Who's Cheatin' Who" (Jerry Hayes) (1997) – 4:02
"There Goes" (Alan Jackson) (1997) – 3:56
"I'll Go On Loving You" (Kieran Kane) (1998) – 3:58
"Right on the Money" (Charlie Black, Phil Vassar) (1998) – 3:50
"Gone Crazy" (Jackson) (1999) – 3:47
"Little Man" (Jackson) (1999) – 4:28
"Pop a Top" (Nat Stuckey) (1999) – 3:05
"The Blues Man" (Hank Williams Jr.) (2000) – 7:03
"It Must Be Love" (Bob McDill) (2000) – 2:52
"www.memory" (Jackson) (2000) – 2:35
"When Somebody Loves You" (Jackson) (2000) – 3:28
"Where I Come From" (Jackson) (2001) – 4:00
"Where Were You (When the World Stopped Turning)" (Jackson) (2001) – 5:05
"Drive (For Daddy Gene)" (Jackson) (2002) – 4:02
"It's Five O'Clock Somewhere" (Jim "Moose" Brown, Don Rollins) (2003) – 3:49
with Jimmy Buffett
"Remember When" (Jackson) (2003) – 4:30

Disc 2
Versions of this album initially had this second disc included.
"Job Description" (Jackson) – 4:43
"Tropical Depression" (Charlie Craig, Jackson, Jim McBride) – 2:57
"Let's Get Back to Me and You" (Jackson) – 2:53
"You Can't Give Up on Love" (Jackson) – 3:06
"Hole in the Wall" (Jackson, McBride) – 3:35
"Buicks to the Moon" (Jackson, McBride) – 2:38
"When Love Comes Around" (Jackson) – 3:06
"The Sounds" (Jackson) – 3:23

Personnel on New Tracks
Eddie Bayers - drums
Jimmy Buffett - duet vocals on "It's Five O'Clock Somewhere"
Eric Darken - percussion on "It's Five O'Clock Somewhere"
Stuart Duncan - fiddle on "It's Five O'Clock Somewhere", mandolin on "Remember When"
Paul Franklin - steel guitar on "It's Five O'Clock Somewhere"
Lloyd Green - steel guitar on "Remember When"
Greenwood Hart - acoustic guitar on "Remember When"
Alan Jackson - lead vocals
Brent Mason - electric guitar
Matthew McCauley - conductor and string arrangements on "Remember When"
Hargus "Pig" Robbins - piano
John Wesley Ryles - background vocals
Bruce Watkins - acoustic guitar
Glenn Worf - bass guitar

Chart performance
Greatest Hits Volume II debuted  at #1 on the U.S. Billboard 200 selling 417,000 copies, becoming Alan Jackson's second #1 album, and #1 on the Top Country Albums, becoming his eighth #1 country album. In April 2005, Greatest Hits Volume II was certified 6× Platinum by the RIAA.

Weekly charts

Year-end charts

Sales and certifications

References

2003 greatest hits albums
Alan Jackson compilation albums
Arista Records compilation albums
Albums produced by Keith Stegall
Canadian Country Music Association Top Selling Album albums